Patrick Desruelles (born 24 April 1957) is a Belgian athlete. He competed in the men's pole vault at the 1980 Summer Olympics.

References

1957 births
Living people
Athletes (track and field) at the 1980 Summer Olympics
Belgian male pole vaulters
Olympic athletes of Belgium
Place of birth missing (living people)